The Open Publication Distribution System (OPDS) catalog format is a syndication format for electronic publications based on Atom and HTTP. OPDS catalogs enable the aggregation, distribution, discovery, and acquisition of electronic publications. OPDS catalogs use existing or emergent open standards and conventions, with a priority on simplicity.

The Open Publication Distribution System specification is prepared by an informal grouping of partners, combining Internet Archive, O'Reilly Media, Feedbooks, OLPC, and others.

History

OPDS is based on the initial work done by Lexcycle, the company behind Stanza, an eBook reader application for iOS. All revisions of the specification were produced by an informal group organized around an open mailing list.

OPDS software
Many e-readers or e-book reading applications support importing books from an OPDS catalog. E-book management applications such as Calibre also often include OPDS server software to make an e-book collection available through an OPDS catalog.

Example of OPDS 1.1 content
An example of an acquisition feed in OPDS:
<?xml version="1.0" encoding="UTF-8"?>
<feed xmlns="http://www.w3.org/2005/Atom"
      xmlns:dc="http://purl.org/dc/terms/"
      xmlns:opds="http://opds-spec.org/2010/catalog">
  <id>urn:uuid:433a5d6a-0b8c-4933-af65-4ca4f02763eb</id>
 
  <link rel="related" 
        href="/opds-catalogs/vampire.farming.xml" 
        type="application/atom+xml;profile=opds-catalog;kind=acquisition"/>
  <link rel="self"    
        href="/opds-catalogs/unpopular.xml"
        type="application/atom+xml;profile=opds-catalog;kind=acquisition"/>
  <link rel="start"   
        href="/opds-catalogs/root.xml"
        type="application/atom+xml;profile=opds-catalog;kind=navigation"/>
  <link rel="up"      
        href="/opds-catalogs/root.xml"
        type="application/atom+xml;profile=opds-catalog;kind=navigation"/>
 
  <title>Unpopular Publications</title>
  <updated>2010-01-10T10:01:11Z</updated>
  <author>
    <name>Spec Writer</name>
    <uri>http://opds-spec.org</uri>
  </author>
 
  <entry>
    <title>Bob, Son of Bob</title>
    <id>urn:uuid:6409a00b-7bf2-405e-826c-3fdff0fd0734</id>
    <updated>2010-01-10T10:01:11Z</updated>
    <author>
      <name>Bob the Recursive</name>
      <uri>http://opds-spec.org/authors/1285</uri>
    </author>
    <dc:language>en</dc:language>
    <dc:issued>1917</dc:issued>
    <category scheme="http://www.bisg.org/standards/bisac_subject/index.html"
              term="FIC020000"
              label="FICTION / Men's Adventure"/>
    <summary>The story of the son of the Bob and the gallant part he played in
      the lives of a man and a woman.</summary>

    <link rel="http://opds-spec.org/image"     
          href="/covers/4561.lrg.png"
          type="image/png"/> 
    <link rel="http://opds-spec.org/image/thumbnail" 
          href="/covers/4561.thmb.gif"
          type="image/gif"/>
 
    <link rel="alternate"
          href="/opds-catalogs/entries/4571.complete.xml"
          type="application/atom+xml;type=entry;profile=opds-catalog" 
          title="Complete Catalog Entry for Bob, Son of Bob"/>
 
    <link rel="http://opds-spec.org/acquisition" 
          href="/content/free/4561.epub"
          type="application/epub+zip"/>
    <link rel="http://opds-spec.org/acquisition" 
          href="/content/free/4561.mobi"
          type="application/x-mobipocket-ebook"/>
  </entry>
 
  <entry>
    <title>Modern Online Philately</title>
    <id>urn:uuid:7b595b0c-e15c-4755-bf9a-b7019f5c1dab</id>
    <author>
      <name>Stampy McGee</name>
      <uri>http://opds-spec.org/authors/21285</uri>
    </author>
    <author>
      <name>Alice McGee</name>
      <uri>http://opds-spec.org/authors/21284</uri>
    </author>
    <author>
      <name>Harold McGee</name>
      <uri>http://opds-spec.org/authors/21283</uri>
    </author>
    <updated>2010-01-10T10:01:10Z</updated>
    <rights>Copyright (c) 2009, Stampy McGee</rights>
    <dc:identifier>urn:isbn:978029536341X</dc:identifier>
    <dc:publisher>StampMeOnline, Inc.</dc:publisher>
    <dc:language>en</dc:language>
    <dc:issued>2009-10-01</dc:issued>
    <content type="text">The definitive reference for the web-curious
      philatelist.</content>

    <link rel="http://opds-spec.org/image"     
          href="/covers/11241.lrg.jpg"
          type="image/jpeg"/> 
 
    <link rel="http://opds-spec.org/acquisition/buy" 
          href="/content/buy/11241.epub"
          type="application/epub+zip">
      <opds:price currencycode="USD">18.99</opds:price>
      <opds:price currencycode="GBP">11.99</opds:price>
    </link>
  </entry>
</feed>

OPDS catalogs

Dozens of OPDS catalogs are available online, and in many different languages.

Many users of OPDS also create their own OPDS catalog, as a way to access their ebooks from any device.

Developers implementing an OPDS catalog usually use the Feedbooks catalog as an example of a fully featured catalog. An OPDS validator is also available to test OPDS feeds.

References

External links 
OPDS standard
OPDS 1.2 (Current version)
OPDS 2.0 (Draft)

OPDS working group links
OPDS Mailing list
OPDS Issue Tracker

Other resources
MobileRead Wiki - OPDS
OPDS Meta-Catalog
OPDS projects on GitHub

Electronic publishing
Open formats
XML-based standards